Eteri Andjaparidze (born September 15, 1956) is a Georgian / American pianist and music professor.

Early life 
Born on September 15, 1956, to a family of musicians in Tbilisi, Republic of Georgia, Andjaparidze received her first piano lessons from her mother. Born to a family of musicians in Tbilisi, Georgia – her father, Zurab Andjaparidze (1928–1997), the leading tenor with the Bolshoi Opera and mother, pianist Yvetta Bachtadze, a student of Alexander Iokheles from Konstantin Igumnov’s piano lineage – Andjaparidze studied at the Moscow State Tchaikovsky Conservatoire with Vera Gornostaeva, a student of Heinrich Neuhaus. Her stepfather Leonid Oakley (1923–1991) was a Georgian scientist. Aged five Andjaparidze entered Tbilisi Special Music School for Gifted Children (piano studio of Meri Chavchanidze), and by the age of 9, she debuted in solo recital as well as a soloist with the Georgian State Symphony Orchestra. The youngest participant, Andjaparidze received Fourth Prize at the Fifth Tchaikovsky International Competition in Moscow and was the first Soviet pianist to win Grand Prix at the Montreal International Piano Competition. Her awards include the Order of People’s Friendship, Order of Honor, and People's Artist of Georgia title.

Career

Andjaparidze was the first Soviet pianist to win the Grand Prix at the Montreal International Piano Competition in 1976. In 1974 she won Fourth Prize at the Fifth Tchaikovsky International Competition in Moscow. She has appeared around the globe in solo and collaborative recitals and as a guest soloist with the major orchestras and conductors. Her programs encompass all genres and styles of the piano repertoire and discography including Grammy and Deutsche Schallplatten awards nominated solo albums.

Currently a piano faculty at NYU Steinhardt and Mannes School of Music, Andjaparidze has taught at DePaul University, SUNY, Moscow and Tbilisi State Conservatoires and conducted masterclasses worldwide. She is the founder and artistic director of the advanced piano performance study program AmerKlavier.

Andjaparidze is a recipient of the International Friendship Order, the Order of Honor, and the People's Artist of Georgia title.

Personal life
Andjaparidze's nephew is professional basketball player Sandro Mamukelashvili.

References

External links 
 Andjaparidze's Homepage
 Naxos Records page for Eteri Andjaparidze
 Eteri Andjaparidze Biography
 Genealogy on Pianists Corner
 Playlist on Pianists Corner

1956 births
Living people
Classical pianists from Georgia (country)
Women pianists from Georgia (country)
DePaul University faculty
State University of New York faculty
Musicians from Tbilisi
Recipients of the Order of Honor (Georgia)
People's Artists of Georgia
21st-century classical pianists
21st-century women pianists